The St. Paul School Building is a historic school building at 200 West 4th Street in St. Paul, Arkansas.  It is a single-story masonry structure, built out of local sandstone.  It has gable-on-hip roof, with a shed-roof addition to the rear. To small triangular louvered dormers flank the projecting entry porch.  The school was built in 1940 with funding from the Works Progress Administration, and serves as a community meeting place as well as school.

The building was listed on then National Register of Historic Places in 2006.

See also
National Register of Historic Places listings in Madison County, Arkansas

References

School buildings on the National Register of Historic Places in Arkansas
National Register of Historic Places in Madison County, Arkansas
School buildings completed in 1939
1939 establishments in Arkansas
Works Progress Administration in Arkansas
Schools in Madison County, Arkansas
American Craftsman architecture in Arkansas
Bungalow architecture in Arkansas